The Tolka (Selkup: Толь-кы) is a river in the Yamalo-Nenets Autonomous Okrug, Russia.

The river flows north of the Arctic Circle, across territories of the Krasnoselkupsky District marked by permafrost and swamps.

Course
The Tolka is one of the main tributaries of the Taz. It is formed in the Siberian Uvaly hills, at the confluence of rivers Ai-Emtoryogan and Pyantymyogan. In its upper course the river heads roughly westwards across the tundra. After a long stretch it bends and meanders in a northeastern direction. Finally, south of the shore of lake Lake Chyortovo (Lozil-To), it bends eastwards, meandering until it meets the left bank of the Taz  from its mouth in the Taz Estuary of the Kara Sea.

Tributaries  
There are numerous lakes and swamps in its basin, the largest of which are lakes Chyortovo and Pyurmato. The river is frozen between mid October and mid May.

See also
List of rivers of Russia

References

External links 
Толька (река)
К ИЗУЧЕНИЮ БИОЛОГИИ СИГОВЫХ РЫБ РЕКИ ТОЛЬКА (ТАЗОВСКИЙ БАССЕЙН, ЯНАО)

Rivers of Yamalo-Nenets Autonomous Okrug
Tributaries of the Taz